Mugilogobius latifrons is a species of goby endemic to the Malili Lake system (consisting of Matano, Towuti and smaller lakes) in central Sulawesi, Indonesia generally being found in extremely shallow waters.  This species can reach a length of  TL.

References

latifrons
Freshwater fish of Sulawesi
Taxa named by George Albert Boulenger
Fish described in 1897
Taxonomy articles created by Polbot